Batillaria mutata is a species of small mudflat saltwater snail, a marine gastropod mollusk in the family Batillariidae, the horn snails.

Distribution
This species is endemic to Ecuador.

References

Batillariidae
Endemic gastropods of the Galápagos Islands
Gastropods described in 1902
Taxonomy articles created by Polbot